Roto Records was a record label based in Lincoln, Nebraska. The name "Roto" was chosen simply because "it [a record] goes round and round."

The label's first releases were in 1956 by local artists Bobby Lowell and The Rock-a-Boogie Boys. The label continued releasing recordings by Lowell and other local artists through the mid-1980s.

Notable artists

References

American independent record labels
Rock record labels
Defunct record labels of the United States